Bart Williams is an Australian former professional rugby league footballer who played in the 1990s. He played for the London Broncos.

Playing career

Schoolboys
Bart Williams played 2 schoolboy tests against the Junior Kiwi team in 1994. In 1994, the Schoolboys hosted, and defeated, the touring Junior Kiwis. This marked the first appearance of a then 15-year-old Owen Craigie, who would represent the Schoolboys a record three times in 1994, 1995 and 1996. Future Australian internationals Brett Kimmorley, Ben Ikin and Luke Priddis were also in the side.

South Sydney
Represented South Sydney RLFC 1995–1997. The South Sydney Rabbitohs (often called Souths and The Bunnies) are a professional Australian rugby league team based in Redfern, a suburb of inner-southern Sydney, New South Wales.[3] They participate in the National Rugby League (NRL) premiership and are one of nine existing teams from the state capital.

London Broncos
In 1998, as part of rugby league's "on the road" scheme London Broncos played Bradford Bulls at Tynecastle in Edinburgh in front of over 22,000 fans.

Success continued in 1998 with a first appearance in the Challenge Cup semi-finals, losing to Wigan. Head coach Tony Currie left the club at the end of the 1998 Super League season and was replaced by Dan Stains.

References

External links
 https://www.independent.co.uk/sport/rugby-league-london-hit-by-sullivan-try-spree-1199188.html

1976 births
Living people
Australian rugby league players
London Broncos players
Rugby league hookers
South Sydney Rabbitohs players
Place of birth missing (living people)
Rugby articles needing expert attention